Crnac may refer to:

 Crnač, a village near Kakanj, Bosnia and Herzegovina
 Crnac, Virovitica-Podravina County, a village and a municipality in Croatia
 Crnac, Sisak-Moslavina County, a village near Sisak, Croatia